Stage17.tv is the first digital entertainment platform to offer curated, theatre-centric content to a global online community.  With its unique focus on Broadway and the arts, Stage17 is pioneering the intersection between theatre and the digital source.  Known as "a hub of must see web series" Stage17 is a new form of digital media with a demographic of 25-to-54-year-old men and women by using Broadway as a jumping off point. It can also be referred to as "the newest intersection of Web, theatre, and independent story telling online." Stage17 produces its own original content and curates content from all over the internet, including popular web series like Wallflowers.

Programming

References

External links 

Broadway theatre
American entertainment websites